Mariana Victoria of Portugal (or of Braganza; Portuguese: Mariana Vitória; ; full name: Mariana Vitória Josefa Francisca Xavier de Paula Antonieta Joana Domingas Gabriela de Bragança; ; 15 December 1768 – 2 November 1788) was a Portuguese Infanta (princess), the eldest daughter of Queen Maria I of Portugal and her king-consort, Infante Pedro of Portugal.

Biography

Mariana Victoria was born at the Royal Palace of Queluz, near Lisbon. She was named after her maternal grandmother, Mariana Victoria of Spain, a daughter of Philip V of Spain.

Her grandmother Mariana went to Spain in 1777 to discuss an alliance with her brother Charles III of Spain. While there, she helped to bring about the marriage of Mariana Victoria and the Spanish king's younger son, Infante Gabriel, her mother's first cousin. They married by proxy on 12 April 1785 at the Ducal Palace of Vila Viçosa. The couple met for the first time at the Royal Palace of Aranjuez on 23 May and had another nuptial ceremony.

The royal couple had three children, of whom two died young. At the birth of her last child, Infante Carlos, she and her husband were in residence at Gabriel's private residence, the Casita del Infante at El Escorial. While there, Gabriel caught smallpox and died at the Casita aged only 36. His wife also succumbed to the illness and died on 2 November; Infante Carlos himself died a week after his mother.

Upon her early death, her son Pedro was recognized by his Portuguese grandmother as an infante of Portugal, in addition to his Spanish infantizado from their paternal side. The same status was accorded Pedro's only son Sebastian of Portugal and Spain.

Mariana died in the Casita del Infante at the age of 19. She and her husband were the founders of the House of Bourbon-Braganza which subsequently joined the Spanish nobility as dukes of Marchena, Durcal, Hernani and Ansola.

Mariana Victoria was buried at the Royal Monastery of El Escorial with her husband and her two young children.

Issue

Infante Pedro Carlos Antonio Rafael Jose Javier Francisco Juan Nepomuceno Tomas de Villanueva Marcos Marcelino Vicente Ferrer Raymundo of Spain (Royal Palace of Aranjuez, 18 June 1786 – Rio de Janeiro, 4 July 1812), married Infanta Teresa, Princess of Beira; had issue;
Infanta Maria Carlota Josefa Joaquina Ana Rafaela Antonieta Francisca de Asis Agustina Madalena Francisca de Paula Clotilde Lutgarda Te of Spain (Casita del Infante, 4 November 1787 – Casita del Infante, 11 November 1787).
Infante Carlos José Antonio of Spain (Casita del Infante, 28 October 1788 – Casita del Infante 9 November 1788).

Ancestry

References 

1768 births
1788 deaths
Portuguese infantas
Spanish infantas
Deaths from smallpox
Burials in the Pantheon of Infantes at El Escorial
House of Bourbon (Spain)
House of Braganza
People from Lisbon
18th-century Portuguese people
18th-century Portuguese women
Deaths_in_childbirth
Daughters of kings